Herbert Walther (January 19, 1935 in Ludwigshafen/Rhein, Germany – July 22, 2006 in Munich) was a leader in the fields of quantum optics and laser physics. He was a founding director of the Max Planck Institute of Quantum Optics (MPQ) in Garching, Germany. He also was Chair of Physics at Ludwig Maximilian University of Munich. He is primarily known for his experimental work on cavity quantum electrodynamics (in the form of the micromaser) as well his groundbreaking work on the ion trap.

At the time of his death he had over 600 publications and numerous awards from a number of prestigious physics and optics societies. In 1978 he won the Max Born Medal and Prize. In 1988 he received the Einstein Prize for Laser Science, in 1990 he received the Charles Hard Townes Award, in 1993 the Albert A. Michelson Medal from the Franklin Institute in Philadelphia and in 2003 the Frederic Ives Medal of The Optical Society.

Bibliography

Articles

References

External links
MPQ - Obituary.
OSA - In Memoriam.

1935 births
2006 deaths
Experimental physicists
Optical physicists
Officers Crosses of the Order of Merit of the Federal Republic of Germany
20th-century German physicists
Fellows of the American Physical Society
Max Planck Institute directors